James Reynolds was one of the two MPs for Bury St Edmunds between 1717 and 1725.

References

Reynolds